Arara may refer to:

Ethnic groups
Arará, an African-Cuban ethnic group
Arara (Pará), an indigenous people of Pará, Brazil
Arara (Rondônia), an indigenous people of Rondônia, Brazil
Arara, or Kwaza, an indigenous people of Rondônia, Brazil
Arara, a term sometimes used for the Kayapo, an indigenous people of Mato Grosso and Pará in Brazil

Languages
Mato Grosso Arára language, formerly spoken in Mato Grosso, Brazil
Pará Arára language, spoken by the Arara people of Pará, Brazil
Arara language (Panoan), also called Shawannawa, a dialect of Yaminawa spoken in western Brazil

Places
Ar'ara, an Israeli Arab town in the Wadi Ara region in the Galilee
Arara, Paraíba, a municipality in the state of Paraíba in northeastern Brazil
Arara River (Acre), a river in Acre, Brazil
Araras, city and county in the State of São Paulo, Brazil
 Arara, India, a census village in Assam

Other uses
Arara, a 1989 album by Sérgio Mendes

Ararat (disambiguation)